May (minor planet designation: 348 May) is a large Main belt asteroid. It was discovered by Auguste Charlois on 28 November 1892 in Nice, and was named for the German author Karl May. The orbital plane is inclined at an angle of 9.7° to the plane of the ecliptic. During its orbit, this asteroid has made close approaches to the dwarf planet Ceres.

This is consistent with an estimate from a 2006 study. It is classified as a G-type asteroid and spans a diameter of approximately 83 km.

References

External links 
 
 

000348
Discoveries by Auguste Charlois
Named minor planets
000348
18921128